Geina periscelidactyla (grape plume moth) is a moth of the Pterophoroidea family.  It is found in eastern North America.

Adults are on wing from June to July.

The larvae feed on grape and Virginia creeper. It is considered a minor pest on cultivated grape. The larvae web together the young leaves and shoots.

External links
Images
Bug Guide
Encyclopedia of Entomology, Volume 3

Oxyptilini
Moths described in 1855
Taxa named by Asa Fitch